Prayaga College, estd. in the year 1988 is College that situates in the heart of Nayarambalam village in Vyppin Island, in the state of Kerala, India. Approximately 1200 students currently studying in this college. A wing of Prayaga - Prayaga Computer Academy (PCA) - provides professional computer education in the island. The current Principal and the Director is Mr. P. T. Prakasan MA.

References

External links
Prayaga College on Facebook

Colleges in Kerala
Universities and colleges in Kochi
Educational institutions established in 1988
1988 establishments in Kerala